The 1952 Swiss Grand Prix was a Formula Two race held on 18 May 1952 at Bremgarten Circuit. It was the first round of the 1952 World Championship of Drivers, in which each Grand Prix was run to Formula Two rules rather than the Formula One regulations normally used.

Pre-WWII Grand Prix great Rudolf Caracciola crashed heavily during a support sports car race. He survived with a broken leg, but this crash effectively ended his racing career. He was driving a Mercedes-Benz 300 SL; his brakes locked up going into a corner and the car skidded off the road and hit a tree.

Italian driver Piero Taruffi scored his only win in a World Championship race, driving for Ferrari.

Report
With the withdrawal of Alfa Romeo from the World Championship, Ferrari were left as the sole competitive team under the existing Formula One regulations. It was therefore decided to restrict the World Championship Grand Prix races to Formula Two cars.

The works Ferrari team brought three drivers to the Swiss Grand Prix, namely Farina, Taruffi and Simon. Regular Ferrari drivers Alberto Ascari and Luigi Villoresi were both unavailable, the former due to his participation in the Indianapolis 500, and the latter because of his having had a road accident. Also running Ferraris were Rudi Fischer and Peter Hirt of Ecurie Espadon, and veteran Frenchman Louis Rosier. Gordini also had a three-car team for this race, consisting of Robert Manzon, B. Bira and the debutant Jean Behra. The HWM team, returning to the World Championship for the first time since the previous race at Bremgarten, fielded the all-British quartet of Abecassis, Collins, Macklin and Moss. Maserati had planned to enter defending World Drivers' Champion Juan Manuel Fangio and fellow Argentinian José Froilán González, but this did not come into fruition. Completing the field were the sole AFM entry of Hans Stuck and a number of privately run cars representing various constructors.

Former Alfa Romeo driver Nino Farina took pole position, alongside Taruffi and Manzon on the front row of the grid. Simon and Fischer started from the second row, in front of Collins, Behra and Toulo de Graffenried, who was driving an Enrico Platé-entered Maserati.

Polesitter Farina led the race until his car broke down. His Ferrari teammate assumed the lead, which he held for the remainder of the race. Moss was impressively running in third place in the early stages, behind Farina and Taruffi, before he had to stop. Moss and Macklin withdrew from the race. The main battle was between Behra and Simon, for second place (once Farina had retired). When Behra had to stop, due to his exhaust pipe having fallen off, Farina, who had taken over Simon's car, assumed second place. However, further problems meant that he once again had to retire, on lap 51, handing second to local driver Rudi Fischer. The Swiss driver took his first Championship podium, being the only driver not to be lapped by Taruffi, who took his first (and only) World Championship race victory. Behra completed the podium, taking third on debut, while Ken Wharton (fourth) and Alan Brown (fifth) took the first points finishes for Frazer Nash and Cooper, respectively.

Entries

 — André Simon qualified and drove 21 laps of the race in the #32 Ferrari. Nino Farina, whose own vehicle had already retired, took over the car for a further 30 laps before again being forced to retire.
 — Juan Manuel Fangio and José Froilán González, whose cars were unavailable, withdrew from the event prior to practice.
 — Peter Hirt qualified and drove the entire race in the #44 Ferrari. Rudolf Schoeller, named substitute driver for the car, was not used during the Grand Prix.
 — Max de Terra drove the #50 Simca-Gordini in the race. Alfred Dattner, who was also entered in the same car, was unable to take part in the Grand Prix due to illness.

Classification

Qualifying

Race

Notes
 – Includes 1 point for fastest lap

Shared drive 
 Farina (33 laps) took over from Simon (18) after Farina retired from the race.

Championship standings after the race 
Drivers' Championship standings

 Note: Only the top five positions are listed. Only the best 4 results counted towards the Championship.

References

Swiss Grand Prix
Swiss Grand Prix
Grand Prix
Swiss Grand Prix